The Miller's Daughter is a 1934 Warner Bros. Merrie Melodies cartoon directed by Friz Freleng. The short was released on October 13, 1934.

Plot

A cat trying to catch a caged bird knocks over a small ceramic figurine of a young country girl, breaking it.  A maid gathers the broken pieces and puts them in a bin in the attic.  The matching boy figurine, a shepherd, comes to life, and he and his lamb go to the attic to rescue their companion.  After the shepherd boy glues the girl back together, they dance to a medley including "The Miller's Daughter" by Lou Handman and Al Bryan, a Cuban instrumental, and the Blue Danube Waltz.  The lamb unwisely awakens a lion figurine, who pursues him.  As the girl, boy, and lamb escape the attic, the lion dashes himself to pieces against the attic door.  The shepherd boy, girl, and lamb escape back downstairs, breaking a table lamp in the process.  The maid, believing the cat to have broken the lamp, swats it with a broom and chases it outside.

The original “So Long Folks” sequence is missing due to a major splice up between an airing of “Honeymoon Hotel” in which features that short’s sequence. The original episode except for the titles was founded on a Nickelodeon airing from 1990.

Production

According to animation historian Michael Barrier, the film is among the first Merrie Melodies short films directed by then-new director Friz Freleng. It was only his 7th film for the series. Freleng became the main director of this series in early 1934. Barrier found that some of the earliest films directed by Freleng came "surprisingly close" to the contemporary Disney animated shorts in both spirit and execution. The Miller's Daughter in particular was "rich in production values". Barrier finds that the "painstaking" drawing of the film, its modeling, and the use of rotoscoping for the movement to attest to the effort devoted to its production. It was an improvement over previous Merrie Melodies films.

The drawing of the film was "Disneyish", but Barrier finds that the subject matter (china figurines coming to life) is reminiscent of an actual Disney short. The film is similar to The China Shop, released by Disney as part of the Silly Symphonies earlier that year. The film was one of the few Freleng-directed films that came close to matching the Silly Symphonies on their own terms. However, competing with Disney turned out to be too difficult and expensive. The production budgets for the animated films of Leon Schlesinger Productions (the company later known as Warner Bros. Cartoons) were lower than their counterparts for Walt Disney Productions. The directors of the Schlesinger studio also completed animated short films at a faster pace than the Disney directors. A new Schlesinger film was ready for release every four or five weeks. Any extra time that Freleng devoted to the production of a single film, would come at the cost of cutting corners in the production of another one.

The Miller's Daughter is a black and white film, one of the last Merrie Melodies released in black and white. In April 1934, the first Merrie Melodies film directed by Freleng was released. It was Beauty and the Beast, a color film using a two-color process. However, the next six films directed by Freleng (including The Miller's Daughter) were all in black and white. A new release season started in November 1934, with the release of Those Beautiful Dames in color. From then on, all Merrie Melodies were color films. Meanwhile the sibling Looney Tunes series continued to be released in black and white. Barrier notes that the change in color came with an increase in payments made from Warner Bros. to producer Leon Schlesinger. Warner Bros. made a payment of 1,750 dollars for each black-and-white Merrie Melodies film. It made a payment of $9,250 for the color films of the series. Despite an increase in the production budget of the series, the Schlesinger budgets continued to be smaller than the Disney ones. According to Barrier, the switch to color did not translate to "greater refinement" for the Merrie Melodies under the direction of Freleng.

Sources

References

External links
 
 The Miller's Daughter on the Internet Archive

1934 films
1934 animated films
American black-and-white films
Films scored by Norman Spencer (composer)
Short films directed by Friz Freleng
Merrie Melodies short films
Rotoscoped films
Animated films about animals
Films about sheep
1930s Warner Bros. animated short films